"Pick Up the Phone" (stylized in all lowercase on Birds in the Trap Sing McKnight) is a song by American rappers Young Thug  and Travis Scott featuring fellow American rapper Quavo of Migos. It was released on June 3, 2016, by Grand Hustle Records, Epic Records, Atlantic Records and 300 Entertainment. It is the lead single from Thug's mixtape Jeffery (2016) and the second single from Scott's second studio album Birds in the Trap Sing McKnight (2016). The song was written by the artists alongside Starrah, who provides additional vocals, and producers Vinylz. Allen Ritter, Frank Dukes, and Mike Dean.

Background and controversy
Young Thug first previewed the song in a snippet that he posted on his Instagram account in March 2016. The song was originally a collaboration between Young Thug and Starrah. Starrah sang the hook instead of Travis. Travis was in the studio when Thug recorded the song, and he wrote the bridge Young Thug sings. About a month later, Travis started playing the song in clubs, but instead of Starrah on the hook, Travis replaced her, and he had his own verse too. He also called the song his own single for his own album without notifying Young Thug of his involvement. Travis kept teasing the song for months before he finally leaked it on his own SoundCloud because the labels would not release it. After Travis called his manager Lyor Cohen, who also owns 300 Entertainment, Thug's record label, an agreement was made that the song would be released on iTunes later that day as a joint single between Thug and Travis.

Commercial performance
"Pick Up the Phone" debuted at number 90 on Billboard Hot 100 for the chart dated for the week of September 3, 2016. The song eventually peaked at number 43, becoming one of Young Thug and Travis Scott's highest charting songs at the time. This was also Quavo's highest charting solo effort before his appearance on Post Malone's "Congratulations", which peaked at number 8 on the Hot 100, then later his appearance on DJ Khaled's, "I'm the One", which debuted and peaked at number one on the chart. The song was certified double platinum by the Recording Industry Association of America (RIAA) in May 2017, for selling over two million digital copies in the United States.

Music video
The music video premiered on August 12, 2016 with the music video for "90210" at the ".wav party" in Los Angeles, California, with both of them later released on Travis Scott's Vevo account on YouTube.

Charts

Weekly charts

Year-end charts

Certifications

References

External links

Lyrics of this song at Genius

2016 singles
2016 songs
Songs written by Young Thug
Songs written by Travis Scott
Songs written by Quavo
Young Thug songs
Travis Scott songs
Quavo songs
Songs written by Mike Dean (record producer)
Songs about telephone calls
Grand Hustle Records singles
Epic Records singles
Atlantic Records singles
300 Entertainment singles
Songs written by Starrah
Songs written by Frank Dukes
Songs written by Allen Ritter
Song recordings produced by Allen Ritter
Song recordings produced by Frank Dukes
Song recordings produced by Vinylz
Song recordings produced by Mike Dean (record producer)